Expressway 12 may refer to the following roads in South Korea:

 Muan–Gwangju Expressway : Muan County, South Jeolla ~ Gwangsan District, Gwangju
 Gwangju–Daegu Expressway : Buk District, Gwangju ~ Dalseong County, Daegu